Kajiado may refer to;

 Kajiado A town in Kenya

 kajiado county